The Women's singles competition at the 2021 FIL World Luge Championships was held on 31 January 2021.

Results
The first run was started at 10:00 and the final run at 11:50.

References

Women's singles